A crown post is a term in traditional timber framing for a post in roof framing which stands on a tie beam or collar beam and supports a collar plate. Historically, crown posts were called king posts, but this usage is confusing and obsolete. A crown post is designed to be in a compression and transfers weight to the tie beam, where a king post is designed to be in tension and supports the tie beam. In the U.K a crown strut is similar to a crown post but does not carry a plate.

References

Timber framing